Cecilia Maffei (born 19 November 1984) is an Italian short track speed skater.

Career
Maffei competed at the 2010 Winter Olympics for Italy. She placed third in her round one races of the 500 and 1000 metres, and fifth in the first round of the 1500 metres, failing to advance in all three. She was also a member of the Italian 3000 metre relay team, which finished fourth in the semifinals and third in the B Final, ending up sixth overall.  Her best overall individual finish, is 21st, in the 1000 metres.

As of 2013, Maffei's best performance at the World Championships came in 2006, when she won a bronze medal as a member of the German relay team. Her best individual performance at a World Championships was in 2010, when she came 15th in the 1000 metres. She also won a bronze medal at the 2010 World Short Track Speed Skating Team Championships for Italy, and eight medals as a member of the Italian relay team at the European Championships.

As of 2013, Maffei has two ISU Short Track Speed Skating World Cup victories, both as part of the Italian relay team. Her first came in 2006–07 at Heerenveen. She also has thirteen other podium finishes as a member of the relay team. Her top World Cup ranking is 7th, in the 1500 metres in 2006–07.

World Cup Podiums

References

1984 births
Living people
Italian female short track speed skaters
Olympic short track speed skaters of Italy
Olympic silver medalists for Italy
Olympic medalists in short track speed skating
Short track speed skaters at the 2010 Winter Olympics
Short track speed skaters at the 2018 Winter Olympics
Medalists at the 2018 Winter Olympics
World Short Track Speed Skating Championships medalists
Sportspeople from Trentino
Short track speed skaters of Fiamme Azzurre